Tomáš Vošvrda (born 12 September 1989 in Ostrava) is a Czech professional ice hockey goaltender currently playing for VHK Vsetín of the Chance liga.

Vošvrda previously played for HC Vítkovice, HC Havířov, Medicine Hat Tigers, HC Slezan Opava, HC Benátky nad Jizerou and Bílí Tygři Liberec.

Career statistics

Regular season and playoffs

International

References

External links

 

1989 births
Living people
Czech ice hockey goaltenders
Sportspeople from Ostrava
HC Vítkovice players
Medicine Hat Tigers players
HC RT Torax Poruba players
HC Slezan Opava players
HC Havířov players
HC Bílí Tygři Liberec players
HC Benátky nad Jizerou players
HC Olomouc players
EHC Bayreuth players
HK Poprad players
MHk 32 Liptovský Mikuláš players
HK Dukla Michalovce players
VHK Vsetín players
Czech expatriate ice hockey players in Canada
Czech expatriate ice hockey players in Slovakia
Czech expatriate ice hockey players in Germany